is a Japanese professional baseball outfielder. He has played in Nippon Professional Baseball (NPB) for the Hanshin Tigers.

Career
Hanshin Tigers selected Ito with the first selection in the 2011 NPB draft.

On March 30, 2012, Ito made his NPB debut.

On December 2, 2020, he become a free agent.

References

External links

NPB stats

1989 births
Living people
Asian Games bronze medalists for Japan
Asian Games medalists in baseball
Baseball players at the 2010 Asian Games
Baseball people from Aichi Prefecture
Hanshin Tigers players
Japanese baseball players
Keio University alumni
Medalists at the 2010 Asian Games
National baseball team players
Nippon Professional Baseball outfielders
People from Seto, Aichi